William Robert Rutledge (March 5, 1866 – February 29, 1948) was a Canadian politician. He served in the Legislative Assembly of British Columbia from 1928 to 1933 from the electoral district of Burnaby, a member of the Conservative Party.

References

1866 births
1948 deaths